James V. LaSala was a Brooklyn mobster and drug trafficker who eventually controlled syndicate drug trafficking in California and several other Southwestern states. 

In the late 1930s, LaSala accompanied Benjamin "Bugsy" Siegel to Los Angeles as hired muscle to expand the Charles Luciano-Meyer Lansky syndicate.  Once in California, LaSala became involved in drug smuggling.  By 1940, he controlled syndicate drug trafficking in California and several other Southwestern states.  LaSala was also a main supplier to Brooklyn mobster Joseph DiGiovanni. 

In the early 1950s, LaSala was named in the U.S. Senate investigations on organized crime, known as the Kefauver Hearings, as a close associate of Los Angeles boss Jack Dragna and Girolomo "Momo" Adamo. 

In 1954, LaSala was convicted of some felony and received a large prison term.  From this time on, no other information is available on him.

References

Year of death missing
American gangsters of Italian descent